John Beverly Misse (May 30, 1885 – March 18, 1970) was a Major League Baseball second baseman and shortstop who played for the St. Louis Terriers of the Federal League in . Previously, he played Minor league baseball with the Concordia Travelers as early as 1910.

External links

1885 births
1970 deaths
Major League Baseball second basemen
Major League Baseball shortstops
Baseball players from Kansas
People from Doniphan County, Kansas
St. Louis Terriers players
Marshalltown Snappers players
Wichita Jobbers players
Salina Trade Winners players
Lincoln Railsplitters players
Concordia Travelers players
Great Falls Electrics players
Lyons Lions players